Grammar is the system of rules and principles for speaking and writing a natural language.

Grammar may also refer to:

 Grammar, a linguistic description of the morphology and syntax of a natural language
 Formal grammar, in mathematics, logic, and theoretical computer science a set of production rules for character strings in a constructed formal language (e.g., a programming language)
 Prescriptive grammar, a style guide laying down norms and guidelines for writing and speaking a natural language

See also
 Grammar school
 Grammer (disambiguation)